Dubai Mall ( "Dubai Mall") is a shopping mall in Dubai. It is the second largest mall in the world after the Iran Mall by total land area, and the 26th-largest shopping mall in the world by gross leasable area, tying with West Edmonton Mall and Fashion Island (Bangkok)—both of which are older than it. It has a total retail floor area of 502,000 square metres (5,400,000 sq ft). Located in Dubai, United Arab Emirates, it is part of the 20-billion-dollar Downtown complex (called Downtown Dubai) adjacent to the iconic Burj Khalifa, and includes over 1,200 shops. In 2011, it was the most visited building on the planet, attracting over 54 million visitors each year.

Twice delayed, Dubai Mall opened on 4 November 2008, with about 1000 retailers, marking the world's second largest-ever mall opening in retail history behind West Edmonton Mall. However, it does not have the most gross leasable space, and is surpassed in that category by nineteen malls including the New South China Mall, which is the world's second-largest, Golden Resources Mall, SM City North Edsa, and SM Mall of Asia.

Statistics
The Dubai Mall recorded 61,000 tickets sold for the Dubai Aquarium and Discovery Centre in the first five days, following its opening. The Dubai Mall hosted over 37 million visitors in 2009, and attracts more than 750,000 visitors every week. In 2010, it hosted 47 million visitors, and saw an increase in foot traffic by about 27 percent over 2009, despite the economic crisis (a consequence of real estate bubble burst). In 2012, Dubai Mall continued to hold the title of the world's most-visited shopping and leisure destination, and attracted more than 65 million visitors, an increase of more than 20 percent compared to the 54 million recorded in 2011. It attracted more visitors than New York City which welcomed over 52 million visitors in 2012, and Los Angeles which had 41 million visitors. The number also surpasses visitor arrivals to all landmark leisure destinations and theme parks in the world including Times Square (39.2 million), Central Park (38 million), and Niagara Falls (22.5 million).

Description

It also has a 250-room luxury hotel, 22 cinema screens plus 120 restaurants and cafes. The Mall has over 14,000 parking spaces across 3 car parks, with valet services and a car locator ticketing system. The mall has won five awards – two awards at the Retail Future Project Awards at Mapic, Cannes, in 2004, for Best Retail Development Scheme (Large) and Best Use of Lighting in a Retail Environment and the Dubai Mall brochure collected three awards at the Summit Creative Awards 2005 in Portland, Oregon – the Gold award for: Best Art Direction / Graphic Design, Silver award for Best 4-colour B2B Brochure, and a Judges Special Recognition award.

The Mall also features the Olympic-sized Dubai Ice Rink for recreational skating and to watch the Emirates Ice Hockey League games and the Emirates A380 Experience, an Airbus A380 aircraft simulator and said Experience will let visitors control the world's largest passenger aircraft around city scenes and famous landmarks. They can take off, land, ascend and do whatever they like with the help of a trainer.

Attractions

Dubai Aquarium and Underwater Zoo inspired from "The Underwater Paradise"

The Dubai Aquarium & Underwater Zoo by Emaar Entertainment, was designed by Peddle Thorp, inspired from "The Underwater Paradise". The aquarium, located in The Dubai Mall, showcases more than 300 species of marine animals, including sharks and rays. The aquarium was awarded with the ‘Certificate of Excellence’ and won the ‘Images Most Admired Retailer of the Year – Leisure & Entertainment’ at Images RetailME Awards 2012.

VR Park Dubai

VR Park Dubai is an amusement park that was formerly operated as the Sega Republic.

The  indoor park features 15 rides and an array of amusement games, including motion simulators, classic carnival games, skill games, and a wide array of redemption games.

Recent additions to Sega Republic rides include Xyclone, Robotnik, and Rope Rush a form of an obstacle course.

The park includes ‘Lazeraze’, a laser maze, as well as ‘Racer’ Bumper Cars. It also features a "soft play area" for smaller children.

The theme park closed on 1 June 2017, after the license to the Sega theme expired. It later reopened in February 2018 as a theme park dedicated to virtual reality under the name of VR Park Dubai.

Reel Cinemas 
Reel Cinemas is a 22-screen cinema, also managed by Emaar Entertainment, in The Dubai Mall. One of the largest theaters in the region, the megaplex features four cinema suites and 17 commercial halls, including the first THX-certified cinema in Dubai.

Hysteria 

Hysteria is a haunted house. It is decorated with special effects, fog lights, and strobe lights. The story of Hysteria revolves around a family whose child mysteriously disappeared. They believe that the guest knows where their child is, so they attempt to kidnap the guest or guests and subject them to a terrifying experience.

Dubai Dino 

Dubai Dino is genuine fossil of Diplodocus, a large, long-necked dinosaur.

Dubai Creek Tower Replica 
The Dubai Mall's Grand Atrium is home to a replica of the Dubai Creek Tower, which is currently under construction. The model gives a 3D rendition of the completed tower's architecture and grandeur.

KidZania 
KidZania is an interactive children-sized edutainment theme park.

Construction
In October 2004, Emaar Properties awarded the construction contract for building The Mall to a joint venture of Dutco Balfour Beatty, Al Ghandi/CCC and Turner Construction The mall, claiming to be the size of 50 "international-sized football pitches," was scheduled to be completed in 2006, but was delayed and finally opened in 2008. Most of the workers who constructed the mall were Indian, Pakistani, Bangladeshi and Sri Lankan guest workers.

Metro Link
In December 2012, Emaar Properties announced the completion of the Metro Link, an  elevated, air-conditioned footbridge that connects the Burj Khalifa/Dubai Mall Metro station to the mall.

Expansion
The project was completed in 2018.

World records and achievements

Dubai Mall records more than 5 million visitors in the month of March 2010 during the one-month Dubai Shopping Festival, setting an all-time record in visitor footfall.
Dubai Mall was named the best shopping experience on 29 April 2010 by Grazia Style Awards.
The Dubai Mall hosted a record 37 million visitors in its first year of operation in 2009, and attracts more than 750,000 visitors every week.
The Dubai Mall hosted a record 47 million visitors in 2010, and broke the record of 37 million visitors received in the previous year, an increase of 27 percent despite the economic crisis.
In 2011, Dubai Mall becomes the world's most-visited shopping and leisure destination, and attracted more than 56 million visitors, an increase of 15 percent from the visitors of the previous year.
In 2012, Dubai Mall continued to hold title of world's most-visited shopping and leisure destination, and attracted more than 65 million visitors, an increase of more than 20 percent compared to the 54 million recorded the previous year, 2011.
In 2017, Dubai Mall unveiled the world's largest OLED screen.

Incidents
 On 25 February 2010 the aquarium (which holds sharks) sprung a leak which led many shops to temporarily close down and forced shoppers to evacuate the mall immediately. It reopened the following day.
 In March 2015, more than a hundred foreign labourers protested in front of Dubai Mall due to overtime wages not being paid, causing disruption to traffic in the area. The situation was brought under control within an hour by the police.
 On 31 December 2015 the mall was evacuated because of a major fire at The Address Hotel, which is adjacent to the mall's compound.
 In December 2016, British TV presenter Richard Hammond drove a tank into the Dubai Mall as part of a stunt for The Grand Tour.
 On 24 April 2017 a power outage occurred, causing the mall to go into a blackout for 90 minutes. No other nearby areas were affected.
 In November 2019, due to heavy rain, large areas of the mall were flooded.
 All malls in Dubai (other than those selling essential goods) were forced to close starting 25 March 2020 due to the COVID-19 pandemic. The Dubai Mall was eligible to reopen 24 April 2020, but delayed its reopening until May.

In popular culture
The Dubai Mall was featured in the documentary show called Megastructures that aired on the National Geographic Channel. The mall was also featured in the BBC One programme, The Apprentice (UK series nine) and Week 5: Dubai Discount buying, where the candidates had to purchase items for the least amount of prices by utilising their negotiation skills. The mall also appears in the TV show, the Grand tour.

Gallery

See also

 Dubai Fountain
 List of shopping malls in Dubai
 List of the world's largest shopping malls
 Mall of Arabia (Dubai)
 Mall of the Emirates

References

External links

 

Shopping malls in Dubai
Shopping malls established in 2008
Architecture in Dubai